Pushmataha (YTB-830) was a United States Navy .  Pushmataha was named in honor of noted Choctaw Nation warrior and statesman Chief Pushmataha.

Construction

The contract for Pushmataha was awarded 5 June 1973. She was laid down on 13 December 1973 at Marinette, Wisconsin, by Marinette Marine and launched 31 June 1974.

Operational history
Pushmataha was assigned to the San Francisco Bay area.  Stricken from the Navy List 2 October 1995, she was transferred to the Maritime Administration 13 September 1995.

References

External links
 

 

Natick-class large harbor tugs
Ships built by Marinette Marine
1974 ships